Jo Jo Zep and the Falcons were an Australian Blues, rock and R&B band. The band released eight studio albums. 
The band were included into the ARIA Hall of Fame in 2007.

Albums

Studio albums

Re-issued albums

Compilation albums

Live albums and EPs

Singles

Notes

A."Run Rudolph Run" was recorded by Joe Camilleri (aka Jo Jo Zep), John Power and studio musicians for a one-off Christmas single. It was performed on Countdown – the Australian national TV pop music series. For this TV performance, Camilleri and Power were joined by Jeff Burstin and John McInerney.
B.Jo Jo Zep and the Falcons disbanded in June 1981, Camilleri recorded Cha and the related singles with Jeff Burstin and Simon Gyllies under the name Jo Jo Zep.

References

External links
 
 Entries at 45cat.com

Notes

Discographies of Australian artists
Rock music group discographies